Judgement of God, is a French drama film from 1952, directed by Raymond Bernard, written by Pierre Montazel, and starring by Andrée Debar and Louis de Funès. The screenplay was based on the German legend from the 15th century. The German title is Agnes Bernauer.

Cast 
 Andrée Debar : Agnes Bernauer
 Jean-Claude Pascal : Albert III, Duke of Bavaria
 Pierre Renoir : Ernest, Duke of Bavaria
 Gabrielle Dorziat : Josepha, Prince Albert's aunt
 Jean Barrère : Count Törring
 Olivier Hussenot : Mr Bernauer, the father of Agnès and Marie (the barber)
 Louis Seigner : the burgomaster (mayor)
 André Wasley : the captain
 Jacques Dynam : a soldier
 Max Dalban : a butcher
 Jean Clarieux : the leader of the outlaws
 Marcel Raine : the minister
 Louis de Funès : the burgomaster's emissary
 Georges Douking : Enrique (the monk)

References

External links 
 
 Le Jugement de Dieu (1952) at the Films de France

1952 films
1950s historical drama films
French historical drama films
1950s French-language films
French black-and-white films
Films directed by Raymond Bernard
Films set in the Holy Roman Empire
Films set in Bavaria
Films set in the 1430s
Films scored by Joseph Kosma
1950s French films